Gazi Nazrul Islam is a Bangladesh Jamaat-e-Islami politician and the former Member of Parliament of Shatkhira-5.

Career
Islam was elected to parliament from Satkhira-5 as a Bangladesh Jamaat-e-Islami  candidate in 1991. He was elected to parliament from Shatkhira-5 as a Bangladesh Jamaat-e-Islami candidate in 2001.

References

Bangladesh Jamaat-e-Islami politicians
Living people
8th Jatiya Sangsad members
Year of birth missing (living people)
5th Jatiya Sangsad members